Quesnoy may refer to:
Le Quesnoy, Nord, France
Louvignies-Quesnoy, Nord, France
Quesnoy-sur-Deûle, Nord, France
Le Quesnoy-en-Artois, Pas-de-Calais, France